A fence is a part of many woodworking tools, they are typically used to guide or secure a workpiece while it is being sawn, planed, routed or marked. Fences play an important role for both accuracy and safety. Fences are usually straight and vertical, and made from metal, wood or plastic.

Most fences either remain static with the workpiece guided along it, or are moved relative to the blade.

Auxiliary and a sacrificial fences 
An auxiliary or sacrificial fence is a fence made of a material not liable to damage the blade – such as wood or plastic – and is usually attached to an existing fence. Such a fence may be used for situations where it is desirable or necessary for the fence to be in contact with, or particularly close to, the blade. They may also be used for attaching accessories to the fence, such as stop blocks and featherboards. Zero-clearance sacrificial fences can also be used to make cleaner cuts. Such fences may be considered sacrificial as they will be cut into or damaged during use.

Examples

Table saws 
For safety on a table saw it is necessary that the workpiece is always in contact with a fence or jig – the workpiece is never cut freehand. Failure to use a suitable fence or jig can result in injuries, such as those caused by kick-back.

The most common fence on a table saw is a rip fence, and is provided as standard with any new table saw. The rip fence is parallel to the saw blade and can be adjusted to different distances from the blade to set the size of the final cut. The fence remains static, while the workpiece is guided along the fence.

For crosscuts a sliding cross-cut fence or a mitre gauge – which incorporates a fence – is used. The workpiece is either held or clamped against the fence.

Alternatively a workpiece might be held or secured to a jig, such as a crosscut sled, that will be guided by a fence or tracks in the table surface.

Mitre saws and mitre boxes 

Mitre saws and mitre boxes have fences that remains static, with the workpiece held or clamped against them. The saw blade is then moved relative to the fence and workpiece.

Router tables 

Router tables usually incorporate a fence which has a gap in the middle for the router bit. The fence can be adjusted relative to the table and router bit. Once adjusted the fence remains static, while the workpiece is guided along it. 

Many router table fences also incorporate a nozzle behind the router bit for connecting a dust extractor or shop vac.

Planers 
A planer, also known as a jointer, has a fence along the length of the tool, perpendicular to the blade. The fence remains static while the workpiece is guided along it.

Biscuit joiners 
Biscuit joiners incorporate a fence, with a basic fence able to cut 0° and 45° slots.

Marking gauges 
Marking gauges incorporate a fence that can be adjusted to set the distance between the fence and scribe or blade. In use the fence moved along the edge of the workpiece.

Woodworking appliances 

Appliances such as shooting boards, bench hooks and mitre boxes include static fences that the workpiece is held or clamped to.

Gallery

See also
Sacrificial fence

Further reading

References

Woodworking jigs
Woodworking tools